WXGM-FM is an Adult Contemporary formatted broadcast radio station licensed to Gloucester, Virginia, serving the Middle Peninsula and the Northern Neck in Virginia, along with Greater Williamsburg.  WXGM-FM is owned and operated by WXGM, Inc.

References

External links
 Xtra 99.1 Online
 

XGM-FM
Radio stations established in 1991
Mainstream adult contemporary radio stations in the United States